Eberhard I of Württemberg may refer to:

Eberhard I, Count of Württemberg
Eberhard I, Duke of Württemberg